Pauline Blodgett Watson (April 13, 1919 - November 12, 2018) was an American figure skater, and a member of Boston Skating Club.  She competed in both singles, winning the US junior title in 1934, and pairs, with partner Roger Turner, with whom she won the US junior pairs title in 1934, and finished runners up in the senior pairs in 1936.

Results

Ladies' singles

Pairs
(with Turner)

References

1919 births
2018 deaths
American female single skaters
American female pair skaters
21st-century American women